Gutenfels Castle, also known as Caub Castle, is a castle 110m above the town of Kaub in Rhineland-Palatinate, Germany.

History
Gutenfels Castle was built in 1220. It was used with the toll castle, Pfalzgrafenstein Castle in the middle of the Rhein and the fortified town of Kaub on the farthest side to provide an impenetrable anti-toll zone for the Holy Roman Emperor until Prussia purchased the area (1866) and ended this toll in 1867.

The castle is part of the Rhine Gorge, a UNESCO World Heritage Site added in 2002.
The castle transitioned from a hotel into private ownership in 2006.

Notes and references

Sources and external links

https://web.archive.org/web/20110719090603/http://www.talderloreley.de/impressionen/burg.15.en.php

Gutenfels
Toll castles